The Peshawar Zalmi (often abbreviated as PZ) is a franchise cricket team that represents Peshawar, Khyber Pakhtunkhwa, Pakistan in the Pakistan Super League. The team is coached by James Foster, and remain under the captaincy of Wahab Riaz.

Management and coaching staff

Squad 
 Players with international caps are listed in bold
Ages are given as of the first match of the season, 27 January 2022

Season standings

Points table

Fixtures and results

Playoffs

Eliminator 1

References

External links 
 Team records in 2022 at ESPNcricinfo

2022 Pakistan Super League
2022 in Khyber Pakhtunkhwa
Zalmi in 2022
2022